The following is a list of South Africa women's national rugby union team international matches. It includes both formally recognised test matches (result counts for the international ranking of World Rugby) as other matches.  The international ranking can be found on the website of World_Rugby.

International tests and other matches 

Statistics and lineups of all matches from November 2018 can be found on the SARU website.

2003

Other matches

2004

Test matches

2005

Test matches

Other matches

2006

Test matches

Other matches

2007 
No matches played

2008

Other matches

2009

Test matches

2010

Test matches

2011

Test matches

2012

Other matches

2013

Test matches

2014

Test matches

Other matches

2015 
No matches played

2016 
No matches played

2017

Other matches

2018

Test matches

Other matches

2019

Test matches 

Springbok Women qualify for 2021 Women's Rugby World Cup.

2020 
No matches played (Covid Pandemic)

2021

Test matches

Other matches

2022

References 

Rugby union in South Africa